The Andaman and Nicobar Command (ANC) is the first and only tri-service theater command of the Indian Armed Forces, based at Port Blair in the Andaman and Nicobar Islands, a Union Territory of India. It was created in 2001 to safeguard India's strategic interests in Southeast Asia and the Strait of Malacca by increasing rapid deployment of military assets in the region. It provides logistical and administrative support to naval ships which are sent on deployment to East Asia and the Pacific Ocean.

Background

Strategic Importance of ANC 

According to the International Hydrographic Organization's (IHO) definitions of Bay of Bengal and Andaman Sea, the Andaman and Nicobar Islands (A&N) fall on the maritime boundary of these two. Indian exclusive economic zone (EEZ) to the north and west of A&N falls within Bay of Bengal and to east of A&N falls within Andaman Sea. Various straits (narrow passage in the sea, also called the channel) in A&N, are officially part of Andaman Sea and not the Bay of Bengal, connect the Bay of Bengal with Andaman Sea and to the shipping routes beyond. The Ten Degree Channel (also called Great or Grand Channel) within India's EEZ is world's busiest shipping trade route which also connects to very narrow and contiguous Malacca and Singapore straits. This route is considered world's biggest strategic chokepoint in military terminology, e.g. India and allies could potentially impose a blockade in case of dispute with China whose economy significantly depends on the export trade through this route. Safety, security and freedom of navigation in this area is vital for the global economy. This area is part of the much larger Indian Ocean region through which 90% of the world's trade passes, which in turn is part of the larger Indo-Pacific region which hosts most of the global maritime trading activity.

Control over vital global shipping route 

The zone of influence of ANC has deep significance in terms of history, culture, religion, economy and trade, EEZs, political and international relations, national security, safety and freedom of navigation of power projection of not only India but also other nations of South Asia and Southeast Asia as well as $3 trillion international trade which passes through south Andaman Sea. ANC influence over the gateway of Far East includes Six Degree Channel and Ten Degree Channel in Indian EEZ in Bay of Bengal, which is connected to the Strait of Malacca. These are crossed by over 94,000 merchant ships every year carrying world's 40% freight trade to and from China, South Korea and Japan. Andaman and Nicobar Islands account for 0.2% of India's land and 30% of its Exclusive economic zone. Sea lines of communication (SLOC) carry more than 90% of global trade. In Indo-Pacific Asia, US$5 trillion annual shipping trade passes through the SLOC and chokepoints of Southeast Asia and South China Sea (SCS). 80% of the global trade passes through Indian Ocean SLOC in oil and natural gas critical for advanced economies.

Control over critical shipping chokepoints 

Since this area in Indian EEZ and ANC influence zone connects Indian Ocean with South China Sea and Pacific Ocean, the safety of Malacca strait is paramount to the economies of numerous countries. Both USA and Russia support the freedom of navigation. Australia's "2013 Defence White Paper" emphasises importance of security of Indian Ocean SLOC trade which has surpassed Atlantic and Pacific oceans trade. However, China's activities in this region continues cause concern among several nations. Against the concern shown by United States, Japan and several other nations, China continues to claim most of South China Sea. China has militarized a reclaimed tiny islet in South China Sea which is also claimed by other nations. This has led to China's conflict with several Southeast Asian nations, including Philippines and Vietnam. In March 2020, Indian Navy discovered 12 underwater drones deployed by China in Indian Ocean for gathering oceanographic naval intelligence aimed at submarine warfare. China has allegedly done the similar underwater drone operation in Pacific Ocean as well.

All 3 major global sea trade routes to Indian Ocean, from Cape of Good Hope and Gulf of Aden or Straits of Hormuz, converge at narrow Six Degree Channel in Indian EEZ resulting in high shipping density, which enhances India's ability to exert influence over the vulnerability and protection of this maritime trade route. Shallow, congested and narrow archipelagic chokepoints in the influence zone of ANC are Straits of Malacca and Lombok Strait to and from South China Sea. Malaca strait is the busiest and most important chokepoint. All trade vessels from Malacca Strait must pass through most important SLOC chokepoint located within India's Anadaman Nicobar EEZ, i.e. Six Degree Channel south of Anadaman and Nicobar Islands. Other two less frequently used channels within Indian EEZ are the Preparis Channel in north and the Ten Degree Channel between the Andaman and Nicobar island groups. Alternative to the shorter and busiest route through Malaca Strait and Six Degree Channel in Indian EEZ, guarded by Indian Military Base in Andaman and Nicobar Islands, is Sunda and Lombok Straits chokepoints in Indonesia in the influence zone of Cocos (Keeling) Islands Australian Military Base. Together, these chokepoints are the entry and exit points between Indian and Pacific Oceans, all of which lie within combined India-Australia military influence zone. This provides geostrategic advantage to Indian and Australian militaries [part of QUAD along with USA and Japan] for joint anti-signal intelligence gathering, submarine tracking and warfare missions in Indian and Pacific Oceans.

India is bolstering military capabilities in Andaman and Nicobar Islands by placing ship-based nuclear missile system as deterrence and a fleet of naval warships with Landing Platform Docks (LPDs) by 2020.

QUAD force multiplier 

Quadrilateral Security Dialogue (QUAD), a strategic dialogue between Australia, India, Japan and USA, is aimed at countering the risk posed to the trade and security of navigation and nations in and around this region. QUAD nations continue to hold regular military exercise in the ANC influence area, such as Exercise Malabar (see also US-Philippines Annual Balikatan Exercise).

Aimed at countering China's activities in Indo-Pacific, to ensure "free, open, inclusive and rules-based Indo-Pacific region ... and maintaining open, safe and efficient sea lanes for transportation and communication", India and Australia signed a military treaty for Mutual Logistics Support and interoperability for reciprocal access to military bases. India has a similar treaty with U.S, while similar treaty with remaining member of QUAD, Japan, is awaited. India, which also has MoU with USA and Japan for encrypted military communications, is likely to sign similar MoU with Australia. India, USA and Japan have been undertaking regular trilateral maritime exercises (Exercise Malabar), which Australia is also expected to join. India-Australia Military Pact paves the way for extending their regional reach through coordinated power projection and mutual use of military facilities in India's Andaman and Nicobar Islands and Australia's Cocos Island. Australia, which already has RAAF base at Cocos Islands, uses it for surveillance and to monitor the area extending between Andaman and Nicobar Islands in the north to Cocos Islands in south.

India-Singapore Bilateral Agreement for Navy Cooperation also provides Indian Navy ships access to Singapore's Changi Naval Base, logistical support and refuelling rights. This allows India, which has similar agreements with Vietnam, Japan, France, Australia and the United States, to counter China's "string of pearls" with "Necklace of Diamonds" ports: Changi Naval Base in Singapore, Chabahar Port in Iran, the Assumption Island in Seychelles, and Duqm Port in Oman.

Historic and contemporary geostrategic soft and hard power 

The area in and around ANC influence zone is part of historic Greater India which was dotted with numerous Indianised Hindu-Buddhist kingdoms. Since 45-47 CE, several ancient Indian empires, such as Chola, Chalukya, Kalinga[Modern Odisha] and Andra traded and exerted Indian cultural influence over Southeast Asia through Malacca Strait. From 16 to 20th century colonial western powers fought against each other for control of this maritime route, trade and the region.

The 750-km long Andaman and Nicobar archipelago consists of a chain of 572 islands. It is located about 1200 km from mainland India, merely 40 km from Myanmar, 160 km from Indonesia and 550 km from Thailand. India's Landfall Island is 40 km from Myanmar's Coco Islands. India's southernmost territory Indira Point is 135 km north of Indonesia's northernmost territory Rondo Island. India's Tillangchong island (north of Camorta Island in Nicobar) is just 440 km from Thailand's Ko Huyong (Similan Islands group). India's Campbell Bay on Great Nicobar Island is 488 km from Thailand's Ko Racha (Racha Noi Island in Phuket Province). Campbell Bay is also 630 km from Malaysia's nearest island Langkawi.

Port-development led encirclement 

To enhance the regional connectivity, trade, safety, security, and to protect the Strait of Malacca channel, India is developing several strategic ports in the influence zone of ANC, namely  Port of Chittagong in Bangladesh with rail connectivity to Tripura, Port of Mongla in Bangladesh, Sittwe Port as part of Kaladan Multi-Modal Transit Transport Project in Myanmar, Sabang deepsea port under India–Indonesia strategic military and economic partnership. Along with India's Sagar Mala projects aimed at developing several coastal ports in India, India is also considering developing more ports in the influence zone of ANC, such as the Dawei Port Project.

Protection of exclusive economic zone 

The region suffers from the problem of piracy. ANC is guarantor of the safety and security of exclusive economic zone of India, which also lies in the vicinity of EEZs of several other nations including  Indonesia, Malaysia, Thailand, Myanmar, Bangladesh, Maldives and Sri Lanka.

History of ANC

Inception and slow expansion 

The island chain had remained underdeveloped because of multiple factors including lack of inter-island connectivity, distance from the Indian mainland and high-cost of building materials. In the 1960s, the Indian security establishment responded to the increased security threats and established a unified Fortress Andaman and Nicobar (FORTAN) under the command of a Vice Admiral as the Fortress Commander. The Indian Army initially placed a battalion and subsequently the 108 Mountain Brigade, in 1990, under the command of the Fortress Commander. The Indian Air Force chose to keep its units under one of its mainland commands and maintained a liaison with the FORTAN headquarters. 37 Wing of the Indian Air Force was raised at AFS Car Nicobar in 1993.

There was a consideration to replace Fortress Commander, Andaman and Nicobar Islands (FORTAN) with a Far Eastern Naval Command (FENC). The previous plan to set up FENC was set in motion in 1995 following a closed-door meeting in Washington between then Indian Prime Minister, P. V. Narasimha Rao, and then US president, Bill Clinton. At the time, Pentagon officials made a formal request to the United Front coalition government in New Delhi to open a base in the islands.

Post Kargil war rapid capabilities expansion 

In 1999, after the Kargil War, Andaman and Nicobar Islands received more attention. The Group of Ministers (GoM) report on Reforming the National Security System recommended the replacement of the FORTAN, under the Indian Navy, with a Joint Andaman and Nicobar Command which will control the assets of the tri-services and the Coast Guard on the islands. The GoM had recommended that the Commander of this Joint Command would report to the proposed Chief of Defence Staff (CDS). The Andaman and Nicobar Command was in place by the end of September 2001 and Vice Admiral (later Admiral and CNS) Arun Prakash was the first Commander–in–Chief of the Andaman & Nicobar Command (CINCAN). A joint command at Andaman and Nicobar Islands would help in to prevent smuggling, piracy, drug and gun trafficking, poaching and illegal immigration in the region and especially in the Malacca Strait. The command would also be in a position to assist the multinational Malacca Straits Security Initiative, aimed at curbing threats in the Malacca Straits. An Indian command in the islands could also counter any future threat from China, which was rumoured to have set up a surveillance post in Myanmar's Coco Islands, 40 km off the northern tip of the Andamans, but this was proved incorrect.

Summary of bases and capabilities 

The following are the air and naval bases under the A&N command, from north to south, some of which are being upgraded under 2027 roll-on plan. By 2020, India is placing ship-based nuclear missile system, fleet of naval warships and Landing Platform Docks (LPDs).

Force structure

Commander-in-Chief, Andaman and Nicobar Command 

The Andaman and Nicobar Command is commanded by a Three-star officer (rank of Lieutenant General of the Indian Army or equivalent) who reports directly to the Chairman of the Chiefs of Staff Committee (Chairman COSC) or CDS (Chief of Defense Staff) in New Delhi. The Chief of Staff of the command is a two-star officer; each component (sea, land, air) is commanded by a one-star officer. The command is currently headed by Lieutenant General Ajai Singh, who took command on 1 June 2021 as the 16th CINCAN.

Chief of Staff
The following is a list of Chiefs of Staff of the A&N command.

Assets

The Naval Component is the largest component and is commanded by a Naval Commodore (one star officer). Naval vessels in the component include missile corvettes, amphibious warfare vessels, landing crafts, offshore patrol vessels (OPV) and fast attack crafts (FAC). INS Karmuk and INS Kulish, two Kora-class corvettes were re-based to Port Blair from Eastern Naval Command on 6 April 2016 and 21 December 2017 respectively. INS Saryu and INS Sumedha, two Saryu-class patrol vessels, have been based at Port Blair since 2013. In addition, four Bangaram-class patrol vessels, two Car Nicobar-class patrol vessels, one Trinkat-class patrol vessel, three Kumbhir-class tank landing ships, one Shardul-class tank landing ship, eight Mk. IV LCUs and the SDB Mk.3 large patrol craft are also deployed under the naval component. INAS 318 with Dornier 228 and Flight 321 are deployed at INS Utkrosh.

The 108 Infantry Brigade of the Indian Army, comprising three battalions, which includes the 21 Bihar, is deployed at Birchgunj in Port Blair under the army component. A Territorial Army battalion is also deployed at Campbell Bay. Indian Airforce's 15 FBSU (forward base support units), comprising 153 Squadron and 4 Maritime Element, are deployed at Port Blair. 37 Air Wing, comprising Helicopters from 122 squadron and Dornier 228 from 151 squadron, are deployed at AFS Car Nicobar.

The Andaman & Nicobar region of the Indian Coast Guard also falls under the purview of the command with RHQ and 745 squadron at Port Blair, DHQ 9 at Diglipur and DHQ 10 at Campbell Bay. In July 2012, the navy commissioned INS Baaz, a naval air station which is located 300 nautical miles south of Port Blair and is the southernmost air station of the Indian Armed Forces. INS Jarawa at Phoenix Bay in Port Blair is the support base for the ships and the main naval and air force establishment in Port Blair.

Modernization

In 2013, the navy proposed to station a nuclear submarine and a landing deck platform at the islands in the future, and the Indian Air Force has decided to station Sukhoi Su-30MKI fighters on the islands along with increasing the number of operational airfields. The Air Force also maintains an Air Defense Wing fielding a squadron of S-75 Dvina Long-Range SAMs and a squadron of S-125 Neva/Pechora Medium-range SAMs. The army's single brigade is planned to be increased by deploying a division size force (about 15,000 troops) under the command. In 2015, it was reported that under the overall "island development plan", which includes a new naval air station at Campbell Bay, the existing runways at Campbell Bay and Shibpur are to be extended, while more airstrips are proposed in the archipelago and more operational turn-around bases. The number of naval vessels based in the island chain will increase to 32 before 2022. In addition, Japanese war bunkers, constructed during Japanese occupation of the Andaman and Nicobar islands during the  World War II, will be revived to bolster security.

Operations

Unilateral security and anti-piracy initiatives 

The Andaman and Nicobar Command manages Indian engagement with regional navies of Southeast Asia. It conducts bi-annual coordinated patrols (CORPATs) with the navies of Thailand and Indonesia, the annual SIMBEX maritime exercises with Singapore, and the biennial Milan multilateral naval exercises. The Command also patrols India's exclusive economic zone to suppress gun running, narcotics smuggling, piracy, and poaching, and conducts maritime surveillance, humanitarian assistance and disaster relief.

Unilateral war exercises

In April 2016, the command conducted an amphibious exercise called 'Jal Prahar'  to check readiness and to ensure functional integrity of all three services on the islands. Ships, aircraft and troops along with tanks from both the Eastern Naval Command and Andaman & Nicobar Command participated in the exercise. Defence of Andaman & Nicobar Islands Exercise (DANX-17) was conducted during 20–24 November 2017. Additional forces including Jaguar fighters, 50th Parachute Brigade, missile frigates and C-130 Hercules heavy lift aircraft also participated in the exercise. The purpose of the exercise was to practice the defence of the island chain and recapturing islands.

Search for Malaysia Airlines Flight 370

For the effort to search Malaysia Airlines Flight 370, the Commander-in-Chief Andaman and Nicobar Command was nominated as the Overall Force Commander of the Indian forces. Surface and airborne assets from the Andaman and Nicobar Command took part in the effort. The ANC command contributed navy ships INS Saryu, INS Kesari and INS Kumbhir, and coast guard vessels ICGS Kanaklata Baruah, ICGS Bhikaji Cama and ICGS Sagar. For aerial maritime surveillance, the ANC command dedicated two navy Boeing P-8I Neptunes, coast guard Dornier 228, and Indian Air Force C-130J Super Hercules from Port Blair, and navy Dornier 228 from Car Nicobar. along with air force Mil Mi-17 from ENC.

See also
 Integrated entities 
 Defence Planning Committee, tri-services command at policy level with NSA as its chief 
 Defence Cyber Agency, tri-services command
 Integrated Defence Staff, tri-services command at strategic level composed of MoD, MEA and tri-services staff
 Armed Forces Special Operations Division, tri-services command at operational level
 Defence Space Agency, draws staff from all 3 services of Indian Armeed Forces
 Strategic Forces Command, nuclear command of India
 Indian Nuclear Command Authority, Strategic Forces Command
 Special Forces of India, tri-services, RAW and internal Security each has own units

 Assets
 List of Indian Air Force stations
 List of Indian Navy bases
 List of active Indian Navy ships
 India's overseas military bases

 Other nations
 Special Operations Forces Command (KSSO) - Russian equivalent command
 Joint Special Operations Command (JSOC) - U.S. equivalent command

 General concepts
 Joint warfare, general concept
 Credible minimum deterrence
 List of cyber warfare forces of other nations

References

External links
 Official web site
 Andaman and Nicobar Islands: India's Strategic Outpost, The Diplomat, Jeff M. Smith, 18 March 2014

Military units and formations of India
Military units and formations established in 2001
Joint military units and formations of India
2001 establishments in the Andaman and Nicobar Islands
Port Blair